Sir Cecil George Lewis Syers, KCMG, CVO, JP (29 March 1903 – 4 December 1981) was a British civil servant and diplomat. He was private secretary to the Prime Minister from 1937 to 1940 and British High Commissioner to Ceylon from 1951 to 1957.

He was secretary of the University Grants Committee from 1958 to 1963.

References 

 "Sir Cecil Syers", The Times, 8 December 1981, p. 12
 https://www.ukwhoswho.com/view/10.1093/ww/9780199540891.001.0001/ww-9780199540884-e-169641

External links 

 

1903 births
1981 deaths
Knights Commander of the Order of St Michael and St George
Commanders of the Royal Victorian Order
English justices of the peace
High Commissioners of the United Kingdom to Sri Lanka
British civil servants
British diplomats
People educated at St Paul's School, London
Alumni of Balliol College, Oxford